The  Telangana Cabinet is the highest decision-making body of executive branch of the Government of Telangana, headed by the Chief Minister of Telangana. 

Telangana's current 17-member cabinet (including chief minister) is its second, being sworn in by the Governor of Telangana on 13 December 2018, 19 February 2019 and 8 September 2019. It is headed by K. Chandrashekar Rao of the TRS, the first Chief Minister of Telangana.

Council of Ministers

Former Ministers

References

Government of Telangana
Lists of current Indian state and territorial ministries
Telangana ministry
Telangana Rashtra Samithi
2018 establishments in Telangana
Cabinets established in 2018